Mark C. Jansen was an American politician from the state of Michigan. A member of the Republican Party, he represented the 28th district in the Michigan Senate. He considered running for the United States House of Representatives in  against Justin Amash in 2014.

Jansen, who had been diagnosed with brain cancer in 2020, died March 23, 2021, aged 61.

References

1959 births
2021 deaths
Republican Party Michigan state senators
20th-century American politicians
21st-century American politicians